Willy Buer (8 June 1928 – 4 March 2022) was a Norwegian footballer who played as a forward. He made one appearance for the Norway national team in 1954.

References

External links
 

1928 births
2022 deaths
Norwegian footballers
Norway international footballers
Association football forwards
Odds BK players
Lyn Fotball players
Place of birth missing